Constantius III was briefly Western Roman emperor of the West in 421. He earned his position as Emperor due to his capability as a general under Honorius, achieving the rank of magister militum by 411. That same year, he suppressed the revolt of Constantine III, a Roman general who had declared himself emperor. Constantius then went on to lead campaigns against various barbarian groups in Hispania and Gaul, recovering much of both for the Western Roman Empire. Constantius married Honorius's sister Galla Placidia in 417, a sign of his ascendant status, and was proclaimed co-emperor by Honorius on 8 February 421. He reigned for seven months before dying on 2 September 421.

Life

Early life

Constantius was born in Naissus, Moesia (present-day Niš, Serbia) of Illyrian origin. Constantius served as a general under Honorius, rising to the rank of Magister militum (Master of the Soldiers) by 411.

Revolt of Constantine III
In 411 Constantius was sent by Honorius to put down the revolt of Constantine III, who had declared himself emperor in Britain in 407. Constantius thereafter led his soldiers to Arles, the capital and residence of Constantine. Upon arriving, he defeated the army of Gerontius, a general who was rebelling against Constantine, before besieging the city.

Constantine refused to surrender, hoping to last until the return of his general Edobichus, who was raising troops in northern Gaul. Edobichus did return to Arles, however he was swiftly defeated by Constantius. Constantine soon after lost much of the remainder of his forces, as his army which had been guarding the Rhine chose to support the usurper Jovinus instead, forcing Constantine to surrender. Despite Constantius' assurances that Constantine would be able to safely retire to a clerical office, Constantius had him imprisoned, and further had him beheaded during his return to Ravenna, in either August or September 411. Honorius' remaining rivals were soon defeated, with Gerontius committing suicide in Hispania, and Jovinus being defeated by Athaulf, king of the Visigoths. Despite this, Honorius was unable to regain control of Britain, nor was any Roman after him.

Campaigns
Constantius initiated a campaign against the Visigoths in northern Hispania in 416, blockading them in order to starve them and force their submission. Soon after, the Visigoth king, Wallia, surrendered to Rome, agreeing to return Galla Placidia (the sister of Honorius, who had been captured by Alaric  412, and been forced into marriage with Athaulf, who was by this time dead), and to wage war against the Vandals and other barbarians who the Romans were still in conflict with, in exchange for food supplies. Constantius then continued to campaign against various tribal groups, regaining control of much of Hispania and Gaul by 420.

Reign
During this time period, generals played a critical role in ensuring the continued reign of Roman Emperors, especially Western Roman Emperors. Constantius' position of magister militum and his skill as a commander allowed him to gain huge influence over the Western Roman Empire, comparable to the earlier Stilicho. For this reason, Honorius bestowed many honors upon Constantius, such as appointing him consul three times: in 414, alongside Constans; in 417, alongside Honorius; and in 420, alongside Theodosius II. In order to further ensure Constantius' loyalty, Honorius arranged the betrothal of his sister, Galla Placidia, to Constantius in 417. Later, on 8 February 421, Honorius made Constantius co-Western Emperor under himself. Constantius reigned as co-emperor only seven months before dying on 2 September 421, in Ravenna. Honorius ruled alone until his death in 423, whereupon Valentinian III, Constantius' son, assumed the throne, with Galla Placidia serving as regent.

References

Bibliography

|-

|-

421 deaths
5th-century Roman emperors
5th-century Roman consuls
Flavii
Imperial Roman consuls
Magistri militum
Patricii
People from Niš
Theodosian dynasty
Year of birth unknown